The men's 3-on-3 basketball tournament at the 2018 Asian Games was held at the Gelora Bung Karno Tennis Center Court, Jakarta, Indonesia from 21 to 26 August 2018. Teams were restricted to under-23 players.

Squads

Results
All times are Western Indonesia Time (UTC+07:00)

Preliminary

Pool A

Pool B

Pool C

Pool D

Knockout round

Quarterfinals

Semifinals

Bronze medal game

Gold medal game

Final standing

References

External links
3-on-3 Basketball at the 2018 Asian Games

Men